Leo Blakely Calland (February 24, 1901 – March 17, 1984) was an American football and basketball player and coach who later became a San Diego city parks administrator.

Early years
Born in Ohio, Calland moved with his family as a child to western Washington, where he attended school in a log cabin on Lopez Island, in the San Juan Islands near the Strait of Juan de Fuca, where all of the other students were Native Americans. He was an outstanding athlete at Broadway High School in Seattle, where he played football under coach Gus Henderson.

Henderson became the head football coach at USC in Los Angeles in 1919, and Calland followed him south. He lettered as a guard for three seasons  and as a senior was named both team captain and most inspirational player on USC's first Rose Bowl team. Calland was named player of the game in the Trojans'  victory over Penn State on New Year's Day, the first bowl game in the current namesake stadium, and also lettered in basketball at USC.

Coaching career
After graduating from USC in 1923, Calland became an assistant coach there, leading the Trojan freshman squads in football, basketball, and baseball. He left in 1925 to lead nearby Whittier College for two seasons in multiple sports, then returned to USC as head basketball coach in 1927. Calland posted a  record over two seasons, winning the Pacific Coast Conference title in his first year with a  mark.  His  career winning percentage remains the highest by a USC basketball coach. In these two seasons he was also an assistant football coach.

In February 1929, Calland was named head football coach and athletic director at the University of Idaho in Moscow, also   a  record in six seasons on the Palouse, but his overmatched Vandals were just  in conference play, defeating only Montana. He resigned after the 1934  then returned to southern California at San Diego State College, where he posted a  record in seven seasons. His Aztecs won consecutive SCIAC championships (1936, 1937), with players including John D. Butler, a future mayor of

Military career and later life
In his early forties, Calland entered the U.S. Navy during World War II, and served as a recreation officer at the 11th Naval District in San Diego. In 1945, he became director of San Diego's Department of Parks and Recreation; during his fifteen years in the post, he oversaw the development of Mission Bay Park and the Torrey Pines Golf Course. Calland became managing director of the San Diego Hall of Champions in 1960 and remained in that position until retiring in 1977, and was himself inducted into the Hall in 1974.

Death
Calland died at age 83 at the Veterans Administration Hospital in La Jolla. He was survived by his wife Sarah, two daughters and a son, and was buried in Fairhaven Cemetery in Santa Ana.

Head coaching record

Football

References

Additional sources
 Laurence, Robert P. "Leo Calland dies; grid star, coach." The San Diego Union, March 19, 1984, pp. B1-2.

External links
 

1901 births
1984 deaths
American football guards
Idaho Vandals athletic directors
Idaho Vandals football coaches
San Diego State Aztecs football coaches
USC Trojans baseball coaches
USC Trojans football coaches
USC Trojans football players
USC Trojans men's basketball coaches
USC Trojans men's basketball players
Whittier Poets baseball coaches
Whittier Poets football coaches
United States Navy personnel of World War II
Basketball coaches from California
Basketball players from San Diego
Basketball coaches from Washington (state)
Basketball players from Seattle
United States Navy officers
Players of American football from San Diego
Players of American football from Seattle
American men's basketball players